Good Dame is a 1934 American pre-Code drama film directed by Marion Gering and written by Sam Hellman, Vincent Lawrence and William R. Lipman. The film stars Sylvia Sidney, Fredric March, Jack La Rue, Noel Francis, Russell Hopton, Bradley Page and Kathleen Burke. The film was released on February 16, 1934 by Paramount Pictures.

Plot

Cast 
Sylvia Sidney as Lillie Taylor
Fredric March as Mace Townsley
Jack La Rue as Bluch Brown
Noel Francis as Puff Warner
Russell Hopton as 'Spats' Edwards
Bradley Page as Regan
Kathleen Burke as Zandra
Guy Usher as Detective Fallon
Joseph J. Franz as Detective Scanlon
Miami Alvarez as Cora
William Farnum as Judge Flynn

References

External links
 

1934 films
American drama films
1934 drama films
Paramount Pictures films
Films directed by Marion Gering
Films produced by B. P. Schulberg
American black-and-white films
1930s English-language films
1930s American films